Truckers is a British drama television series that first broadcast on BBC One on 10 October 2013. The series is about Britain through the lives of truck drivers working in Nottingham.

Cast

Stephen Tompkinson as Malachi Davies
Sian Breckin as Wendy Newman
John Dagleish as Martin Banks
Jenn Murray as Michelle Truss
Harry Treadaway as Glen Davies
Ashley Walters as Steven "Steve" Warley
Ray Ashcroft as Bob
Charlotte Atkinson as Andrea
Trevor Atkinson Action Vehicle Driver
Terry Connor Action Vehicle Driver
Miffy Smith Artic and Trailer Driver
Andrew Howells Artic and trailer Driver
Martin Meden Action Vehicle Driver
Cliff Bradley Action Vehicle Driver
All Vehicle Modifications carried out by Wayne Ridel @ Anglo American Filming.

Production
The series was announced on 11 January 2012 by Ben Stephenson, controller of drama commissioning at the BBC at the Broadcasting Press Guild lunch. The drama was commissioned with Danny Cohen.

Episode list

Reception

Ratings
Overnight figures showed that the first episode on 10 October 2013 was watched by 13.5% of the viewing audience for that time, with 2.88 million watching it. The second, third, fourth and fifth episodes were watched by 10.6%, 11.0%, 10.4% and 11.4% of the viewing audience respectively.

Critical reception
David Butcher of Radio Times said the following about the first episode: "The trouble is, none of it makes a lot of sense, and the long, colourful speeches that writer William Ivory gives Tompkinson can’t save the drama from clattering oddness." Sarah Rainey, writing for The Daily Telegraph gave it four out of five stars, called it a "bitter-sweet offering" and said: "The script offered a good mix of humour and poignancy, and there were also some unexpectedly lovely scenes of the countryside". Ellen Jones of The Independent said: "The laboriously regional script didn't make it any easier. The dialogue was so crammed with earthy wisdom and quaint sexual euphemisms that the actors struggled to get a breath in." and "Truckers''' debt to films such as Brassed Off and The Full Monty'' was made obvious".

International broadcasters
In Australia the series premiered on 23 April 2015 on BBC First.

Home media
The DVD edition was released on 3 February 2014.

References

External links
 
 
 
 Truckers Trailer

2010s British drama television series
2013 British television series debuts
2013 British television series endings
BBC television dramas
English-language television shows
Television series by All3Media
Television shows set in Nottinghamshire